Ohtsubogawa Dam  is an earthfill dam located in Ishikawa Prefecture in Japan. The dam is used for irrigation. The catchment area of the dam is 0.9 km2. The dam impounds about 93  ha of land when full and can store 490 thousand cubic meters of water. The construction of the dam was started on 1986 and completed in 1992.

See also
List of dams in Japan

References

Dams in Ishikawa Prefecture